Shinkai may refer to:

 DSV Shinkai, research submersible
 Shinkai (album)
 Shinkai railway station, Pakistan

People with the given name or surname Shinkai include:

 Makoto Shinkai (born 1973), Japanese animator, filmmaker and manga artist
 Seiji Shinkai (born 1944), Japanese chemist and professor
 Shinkai Karokhail (born 1962), Afghan politician and rights activist

See also
Xinkai (disambiguation)